Joy Ride 3: Roadkill (also known as Joy Ride 3) is a 2014 American horror film written and directed by Declan O'Brien and stars Ken Kirzinger, Jesse Hutch, Kirsten Prout, Ben Hollingsworth and Dean Armstrong. It is a sequel to Joy Ride (2001) and Joy Ride 2: Dead Ahead (2008) and the third and final installment of the Joy Ride series.

The film was released digitally and on direct-to-video in June 2014.

Plot
Racecar drivers Jordon and Austin, along with their team—Jewel (Jordon's girlfriend), Mickey, Alisa and Bobby — are headed on trip to Canada so that they can compete in the Road Rally 1000. Whilst stopping for lunch, Austin discovers an unpatrolled highway on a map that he realises could shorten their journey by a day, but are warned against taking the route by a creepy old trucker named Barry. Nevertheless, the group decides to take the route anyway.

During the journey, Austin's friends begin jokingly teasing him about a crash he had once gotten in. Austin gets upset, however, and vents his frustrations by messing with another truck driver (who happens to be Rusty Nail) before speeding off. Later, however, Rusty Nail catches up to the group and starts messing with them himself. Eventually, Rusty deliberatly rams into a flatbed trailer which the group had been using to carry their racecar, causing it to detach from their SUV and run off the road with Mickey and Bobby inside. Rusty then tailgates Jordon, who dodges to get out of the way of an oncoming station wagon; when Rusty tries to do the same, he jackknifes, and Austin and co. are seemingly able to get away. However, Rusty then checks a camera he has mounted to the front of the truck, identifying Jordon's license number, and later uses an CB radio to hail Jordon and co., vowing revenge.

That night, Jewel and Austin offer to head to the police station to report the incident. During their trip, however, Rusty Nail catches up to Jewel and Austin, and quickly runs them off the road before putting their unconscious bodies in the back of his truck.

Rusty takes Jewel and Austin to a deserted field, where he kills Austin by shoving his face into an engine fan. He then calls Jordon over a walkie-talkie (which the group had been using to communicate with each other between the vehicles). Rusty tells Jordon that he'll give Jewel back if he and the others hand over the racecar, and instructs Jordon to meet up with him at an old warehouse in an hour.

Jordon, Mickey, Alisa, and Bobby arrive at the warehouse and split up looking for Rusty. Suddenly, Rusty appears and kidnaps Bobby before fleeing in his truck. The rest of the group pursue him in the racecar, only stopping when they come across a police car on the side of the road. The officer driving the car agrees to help them out, only for Rusty to abruptly plow through his car, killing him.

Jordon, Mickey, and Alisa get back to trying to follow Rusty. During the journey, Rusty pulls over and contacts Jordon, where he taunts him by killing Bobby as the group listens helplessly over the radio. Rusty then tells Jordon to meet him at a junkyard and give himself up; only then will he set Jewel and Austin free. Mickey tries to convince Jordon and Alisa to get help from law enforcement, and makes Jordon pull over, but they both refuse his offer, and Mickey thus decides to go look for help himself on foot. Mickey finds Rusty's truck on the side of road, only for Rusty himself to appear and kill him.

Jordon sends Alisa to go get help and enters the junkyard alone to confront Rusty Nail. The two fight, as Rusty indicates Jewel is trapped in a dangling car about to be crushed. Just as it seems Rusty has the upper hand, Alisa runs him over with the racecar, and she and Jordon go to rescue Jewel. When they get to the car, however, Jordon realises that the source of Jewel's apparent "screaming" was coming from a video camera in the trunk playing pre-recorded footage. As they watch helplessly, Jewel (tied to the roof of Rusty's truck) is killed when Rusty drives her into a steel bridge girder.

Enraged, Jordon and Alisa get in the car to go find Rusty Nail, but he rams into them, trying to crush them. Jordon manages to escape the car and runs to a nearby wrecking claw, using it to put Rusty's truck into the crusher, with Rusty inside. Later, however, when Williams and his men investigate, Rusty Nail is nowhere to be found. The film ends with Rusty Nail hitching a ride with another truck driver.

Cast
 Ken Kirzinger as Rusty Nail
 Jesse Hutch as Jordon Wells
 Kirsten Prout as Jewel McCaul
 Ben Hollingsworth as Mickey Cole
 Leela Savasta as Alisa Rosado
 Gianpaolo Venuta as Austin Morris
 Jake Manley as Bobby Crow
 James Durham as Officer Jenkins
 Dean Armstrong as Officer Williams
 David Ferry as Barry
 J. Adam Brown as Rob
 Sara Mitich as Candy

In the film,  Austin Morris is identified correctly when Rusty Nail finds the group in a laptop, but in the film's end credits his last name is listed as "Austin Moore".

Release
The film was released straight to DVD and Blu-ray on June 17, 2014. The film grossed over $1.223 million in home video sales.

References

External links
 

2014 films
2014 direct-to-video films
2010s thriller films
20th Century Fox direct-to-video films
Direct-to-video thriller films
Direct-to-video sequel films
Films shot in Manitoba
Films set in 2014
Films set in Kansas City, Missouri
Regency Enterprises films
American road movies
2010s road movies
Trucker films
American serial killer films
2010s English-language films
Films directed by Declan O'Brien
2010s American films